Kramatorsk Airport, also known as Kramatorsk military airfield, is a military airfield in Donetsk Oblast of Ukraine. The airbase is 3.4 km SSE from the centre of Kramatorsk and at about 20 km south of Slovyansk.

The airfield was captured by pro-Russian forces during the early phases of the War in Donbass in 2014.

On 15 April 2014 the airfield was recaptured by the Ukrainian military. Different sources stated the death toll up to 11.

On 10 June 2014 the Ukrainian military claimed that about 40 pro-Russian fighters were killed in a 3-hour battle.

As a result of shelling, that was carried by pro-Russian forces on 10 February 2015 ten people were injured at the military base.

See also
 Battle of Kramatorsk

References

Ukrainian airbases
Buildings and structures in Kramatorsk